Neogene carrerasi is a moth of the  family Sphingidae. It is known from Argentina.

References

Neogene (moth)
Moths described in 1911